Dogaru, meaning "cooper", is a Romanian surname. Notable people with the surname include:

Anastasia and Tatiana Dogaru
Dana Dogaru, Romanian actress
Vlad Dogaru, Romanian basketball playert

Romanian-language surnames
Occupational surnames